Alfred J. Freddoso (born 1946) is an American philosopher and Professor Emeritus of Philosophy and John and Jean Oesterle Professor Emeritus of Thomistic Studies at the University of Notre Dame.
He is the father of David Freddoso.

See also
American philosophy
List of American philosophers

References

University of Notre Dame faculty
Living people
American philosophers
Metaphysicians
1946 births